Camadevi (also spelled Jamadevi; IPA: [tʃaːmaˈdeːʋiː]; Pali: Cāmadevī; , , Mon: စာမ္မာဒေဝဳ, ; 7th-century – 8th-century) was the first ruler/Queen of Hariphunchai (Pali: Haribhuñjaya), which was an ancient Mon kingdom in the northern part of Thailand today.

Most records of Camadevi mention her life period differently. For example: A book called “Chinnakanmalipakon” said that she reigned in 662 for 7 years; Manit Wallipodom's research mentioned that she was born in 623, reigned in 662 for 17 years and died in 715 at the age of 92; and The legend of Camadevi translated and edited by Suttavari Suwannapat mentioned that she was born in 633, reigned in 659 up til 688 and died in 731.

Early life 
As written in the Legend of Cāmadevivaṃsa, it was recorded that she was a scion of the ruler of Lavo Kingdom. But according to the mythology, people believe she was a daughter of a wealthy man named Inta, who lived in Nong Duu village, which is in Pasang district of Lamphun at the present time. When she turned 3 months, she was grabbed and taken away by a giant bird. The bird flew over Doi Suthep and gave the young baby to a hermit named Suthewa Rusi. He took good care of her and named her Vi.

Vi grew up well-educated with Suthewa Rusi. As Vi turned 13 years old, he prophesied her destiny and found out that she had a chance to be the ruler of a great kingdom in the future. He built a raft and sent her away to Lavo because it was the most prosperous kingdom at that time. It took months for the raft to reach Lavo Kingdom. As the raft reached the kingdom, people were very amazed by the incident. The King and the queen were very pleased about the girl's arrival. They kept her and gave her a new name, which was Camadevi.

Camadevi grew up and lived comfortably in the royal court of Lavo Kingdom. After the ruler and his wife were informed by the fortuneteller that this girl had glory to become the powerful ruler of a great kingdom and would also marry a great man, they raised Camadevi position to be the Princess of Lavo and arranged a coronation for her when she was 14 years old.

Marriage 
A marriage was arranged for Camadevi, as she turned 20. She was supposed to marry Ramrat, a prince from the neighboring Kingdom, Ramburi. As she was well known for her beauty, another prince from a Mon kingdom asked the King of Lavo for permission to marry her but was rejected. He felt enraged and decided to start a war with Lavo Kingdom to win Camadevi.

Camadevi chose to lead the army herself. She gained allies from neighboring kingdoms and could win the army. Her victory was admired and celebrated by the people but Camadevi was sorrowful about all the lives lost in this war, so she gave an order to build a temple on the battleground devoted to the deceased.

According to the Legend of Cāmadevivaṃsa, the war took place in 653. After the situation was settled, the marriage was arranged 2 years later.

Ruling Haripunchai 
Around 659, Suthewa Rusi came to Lavo to ask Camadevi take over the new kingdom, Haripunchai, which he and his friend had established. However, the story was recorded differently in the Legend of Cāmadevivaṃsa. It was written that Prince Ramrat was ordained at that time. Since her husband was not with her, the invitation was sent from Haripunchai, asking her to be in charge. According to the mythology, she accepted the offer because the citizens were in trouble and that the city needed a leader. She also wanted to repay Suthewa Rusi for his kindness for raising her when she was young.

It took her 7 months to reach Haripunchai by boat. After arriving, Camadevi was crowned to be the ruler of the Haripunchai. She was already pregnant before leaving Lavo and gave birth to 2 sons 7 days after the coronation. Her first son was named Mahantayot and her second son Anantayot.

Death 

Camadevi reigned until 688 before Mahantayot took over. She left her role in the government and changed to preserve Buddhism instead when she turned 60. She died in 731 when she was 89 years old.

After her death, Mahantayot arranged a funeral for her for 7 days. Her bones were collected and contained in the Suwan-Chang-Kot-Chedi at Wat Camadevi in Lamphun after the cremation.

Monument 
Camadevi's statue is located in Naimueang Sub-district, Lamphun province. It is situated about 1 km from the city hall near the Nongdork public garden. The opening ceremony of the monument took place on October 2, 1982, and was inaugurated by Maha Vajiralongkorn Bodindradebayavarangkun.

References

Queens regnant in Asia
7th-century births
8th-century deaths
7th-century women rulers
8th-century women rulers
Lamphun province
Medieval Thailand
Founding monarchs